The Killer Speaks is an  American documentary television series on A&E that debuted on April 11, 2013 and ended on May 29, 2014. The Killer Speaks features actual convicted felons as they describe their crimes step-by-step in chilling detail. The series purports to offer an autopsy of their psychology and motivations. Subjects include spree killers, serial killers and domestic violence killers. The Killer Speaks casts killers from all over the country, not just from The First 48 series.

Episodes

Season 1 (2013)

Season 2 (2014)

References

External links

2010s American documentary television series
2013 American television series debuts
2014 American television series endings
English-language television shows
Television series by ITV Studios
A&E (TV network) original programming